The 1960 United States Senate election in Kansas took place on November 8, 1960. Incumbent Republican Senator Andrew Frank Schoeppel won re-election to a third term.

Primary elections
Primary elections were held on August 2, 1960.

Democratic primary

Candidates
Frank Theis, lawyer
Joseph W. Henkle Sr., incumbent Lieutenant Governor of Kansas

Results

Republican primary

Candidates
Henry P. Cleaver, clerk
Andrew F. Schoeppel, incumbent U.S. Senator

Results

General election

Results

See also 
 1960 United States Senate elections

References

Bibliography
 

1960
Kansas
United States Senate